College Avenue is one of two stations on Metra's Union Pacific West Line located in Wheaton, Illinois. The station is located at 303 North President Street, and lies next to Wheaton College. Unless otherwise announced, inbound trains use the north platform and outbound trains use the south platform.

As of December 5, 2022, College Avenue is served by 54 trains (28 inbound, 26 outbound) on weekdays, by all 10 trains in each direction on Saturdays, and by all nine trains in each direction on Sundays and holidays.

College Avenue station is located at ground level and consists of two side platforms. Three tracks run between the platforms, though one does not access the station. There is a station house next to the inbound (north) track, which is open 24 hours. Tickets are available at the station house on weekdays. The Illinois Prairie Path runs along the south edge of the complex.

Bus connections
Pace

References

External links 

Metra stations in Illinois
Former Chicago and North Western Railway stations
Wheaton, Illinois
Railway stations in DuPage County, Illinois
Railway stations in Illinois at university and college campuses
Former Chicago, Aurora, and Elgin stations
Railway stations in the United States opened in 1971
Union Pacific West Line